Stefan Pogonowski (1895–1920) was a Polish professional soldier and military officer. He served in the Imperial Russian Army during World War I and then the newly recreated Polish Army during the Polish-Bolshevist War of 1920. He was killed when leading a charge of a battalion he commanded during the battle of Radzymin. He was posthumously awarded the Silver Cross of Virtuti Militari and promoted to the rank of captain. There are streets named after him in Łódź and Warsaw.

1895 births
1920 deaths
Polish military personnel
Recipients of the Virtuti Militari